Alternognathus is an extinct conodont genus in the family Elictognathidae. An extensive study on its population dynamics and lifespan has recently been published.

References 

 Important candidate sections for stratotype of conodont based Devonian-Carboniferous boundary. Willi Ziegler and Charles A. Sandberg, Courier Forschungsinstitut Senckenberg, 1984
 Palmatolepis-based revision of upper part of standard Late Devonian conodont zonation. Willi Ziegler and Charles A. Sandberg, GSA Special Papers, 1984, volume 196, pages 179–194,

External links 

 

Ozarkodinida genera
Devonian conodonts